Michał Seweryński (born 1 July 1939 in Łódź) is a professor of the University of Łódź. Doctor honoris causa of the University of Lyon 3. Expert on Polish and international labour law. The author of about 130 scientific publications and reports at international congresses. Visiting professor at universities in France, Canada, Switzerland, Spain and Japan. Between 2006 and 2007, Minister of Science and Higher Education in Poland.

A member of Polish and foreign scientific societies. Member of the Papal Council for Secular Affairs, member of the Legislative Council at the Chairman of the Council of Ministers, and Deputy Chairman of the Government Labour Law Reform Commission. Former Rector of the University of Łódź, former Chairman of the Conference of Rectors of Polish Universities. A Knight of the Order of Polonia Restituta and of Palmes Academiques (France), Pro Ecclesia et Pontifice. Honorary Consul of France in Łódź.

He is married, with two children.

External links
The Polish Ministry of Science and Higher Education
The Chancellery of the Prime Minister

1939 births
Living people
Academic staff of the University of Łódź
Politicians from Łódź
Knights of the Order of Polonia Restituta
Chevaliers of the Ordre des Palmes Académiques
Polish legal scholars
Labour law scholars
Government ministers of Poland
Members of the Senate of Poland 2011–2015
Members of the Senate of Poland 2015–2019
Members of the Senate of Poland 2019–2023